Wasi Qaqa (Quechua wasi house, qaqa rock, "house rock", Hispanicized spelling Huasijaja) is a mountain in the Andes of Peru, about  high. It is situated in the Huancavelica Region, Huancavelica Province, Acobambilla District. Wasi Qaqa lies north of Wayllasqa.

References

Mountains of Huancavelica Region
Mountains of Peru